Mazloomi is a surname of Iranian origins. People with this name include:

 Carolyn L. Mazloomi (born 1948), American curator, quilter, author, art historian, and aerospace engineer
 Gholamhussein Mazloomi (1950–2014), Iranian football player, coach, and football administrator
 Mir Taher Mazloomi (born February 26, 1975), Iranian actor
 Parviz Mazloomi (born 1954), Iranian footballer, coach

Surnames of Iranian origin